École secondaire publique Louis-Riel (Louis Riel Public Secondary School) is a high school in the Blackburn Hamlet neighbourhood of Ottawa, Ontario, Canada, part of the Conseil des écoles publiques de l'Est de l'Ontario (Eastern Ontario Public School Board). It opened in the fall of 1980, and the name Louis Riel was chosen by the students in 1981.

Phase 1 of the school's construction finished in 1980, accommodating 250 students from the Gloucester region in the east end of Ottawa. Phase 2 was completed in 1982 featuring the school gymnasiums, cafeteria, and science and tech labs.

In 2003, a new annex was added, to accommodate grade 7 and 8 students. The school had previously only accommodated students from grades 9 through 12.

The school now serves approximately 1000 students.

Dome
In 2005, a  dome, North America's largest air supported fabric structure, opened to the public. Its construction was a joint project by the Ottawa Lions Track & Field Club and the CEPEO, and made it possible for Louis-Riel to offer a new Sports program to the region's students, in addition to providing extra track and field training facilities to the Ottawa Lions.

The dome contains:
 4 lanes of 400m and 6 lanes of 110m running track
 a full size sport field (which can be divided into 3 smaller fields, with movable netting)
 an activity/meeting room
 4 change rooms (2 male/ 2 female)
 2 bathrooms (1 male/ 1 female)
 weight training room

Notable alumni
Erik Gudbranson, NHL defenceman (Calgary Flames)
Adrian Aucoin, retired NHL defenceman
Mathieu Dandenault, retired NHL player
Jonathan David, professional soccer player (Lille OSC)
Vanessa Gilles, national team soccer player (Canada women%27s national soccer team)

See also
List of high schools in Ontario

References

External links
École secondaire publique Louis-Riel Official Site (French)
Ottawa Lions Dome Web page

Louis-Riel
Louis-Riel, Ecole secondaire publique
Louis-Riel, Ecole secondaire publique
Air-supported structures
Educational institutions established in 1980
1980 establishments in Ontario
Middle schools in Ottawa